The Nutmeg 24 is a Canadian trailerable sailboat, that was designed by William Shaw and first built in 1964. The design is out of production.

The Nutmeg 24 was featured in the July 1964 issue of Popular Boating.

Production
Production of the boat was commenced in 1964 by Tanzer Industries of Dorion, Quebec. The company entered bankruptcy in May 1986 and production had ended by then.

Hughes Boat Works of Canada later produced a derivative design, the Hughes 24.

Design
The Nutmeg 24 is based on the earlier Oriental Mercy design of 1955 and also the Shaw 24, both wooden boats.

The Nutmeg 24 is a small recreational keelboat, built predominantly of fiberglass, with wood trim. It has a masthead sloop rig, an internally mounted rudder. It displaces  and carries  of lead ballast.

The boat is normally fitted with a small  outboard motor for docking and maneuvering.

The design has sleeping accommodation for four people.

Operational history
In a 2010 review Steve Henkel wrote, "Best features: The boat has low freeboard and a nice springy sheer, presenting a pretty picture to dockside observers. Worst features: Despite Bill Shaw’s fame engendered by the success of his Shaw 24 in winning MORC races, the Nutmeg never measured up (though maybe it's just that she never got a chance to compete). In any case, for most folks she lacks sufficient cruising space below, and not enough boats were sold to permit organizing a one-design class for club racing."

See also
List of sailing boat types
Similar sailboats
Achilles 24
Balboa 24
C&C 24
Challenger 24
Columbia 24
Dana 24
Islander 24
Islander 24 Bahama
MacGregor 24
Mirage 24
San Juan 24
Seidelmann 245
Shark 24
Tonic 23

References

Keelboats
1960s sailboat type designs
Sailing yachts
Trailer sailers
Sailboat type designs by William Shaw
Sailboat types built by Tanzer Industries